Kalateh-ye Amiri may refer to:
 Mirabad, Darmian
 Sangan, South Khorasan